Hailey is an extinct town in Barry County, in the U.S. state of Missouri. The GNIS classifies it as a populated place.

A post office called Hailey was established in 1881, and remained in operation until 1936. N. L. Hailey, an early postmaster, gave the community his last name.

References

Ghost towns in Missouri
Former populated places in Barry County, Missouri